"Remember Me" is a song by British Sea Power, released in 2001 as their second single and the first released after signing to Rough Trade Records. It was also the first track to be recorded with longtime producer Mads Bjerke. Whilst it is generally felt to be an uplifting song, the lyrics deal with a decline into old age and the mental decay that comes with it. It has been played at almost every gig the band have ever played and was re-recorded for their debut album, The Decline of British Sea Power. That version was also released as the final single from The Decline of British Sea Power in 2003 and reached number 30 in the UK Singles Chart. B-side "A Lovely Day Tomorrow" was also re-recorded three years later and released as a limited edition single. The CD also features "Birdy", an instrumental track that was rumoured to have included lyrics that never made the release since Yan never got around to recording them.

Track listings

CD (rtradescd032)
 "Remember Me" (Yan/BSP) – 3:36
 "A Lovely Day Tomorrow" (Hamilton/BSP) – 4:04
 "Birdy" (Yan/BSP) – 3:39

7" vinyl (RTRADES032)
 "Remember Me" (Yan/BSP) – 3:36
 "A Lovely Day Tomorrow" (Hamilton/BSP) – 4:04

CD (rtradescd125)
 "Remember Me" (Yan/BSP) – 3:10
 "Salty Water" (Yan/BSP) – 3:52
 "Good Good Boys" (Hamilton/BSP) – 3:46

CD (rtradescd126)
 "Remember Me" (Yan/BSP) – 3:10
 "Moley & Me" (Hamilton/BSP) – 4:09
 "The Smallest Church In Sussex" (Hamilton/BSP) – 2:54

7" vinyl (RTRADES125)
 "Remember Me" (Yan/BSP) – 3:10
 "The Scottish Wildlife Experience" (BSP) – 2:56

References

External links
 "Remember Me" at Salty Water (fansite)
 The Remember Me 7" Swap Shop

British Sea Power songs
2001 singles
2001 songs
2003 singles
Rough Trade Records singles